Many both in and outside Japan share an image of the Japanese work environment that is based on a  and  model used by large companies as well as a reputation of long work-hours and strong devotion to one's company. This environment is said to reflect economic conditions beginning in the 1920s, when major corporations competing in the international marketplace began to accrue the same prestige that had traditionally been ascribed to the daimyō–retainer relationship of feudal Japan or government service in the Meiji Restoration.

Large companies 

At the very top, the most prestigious companies would recruit and retain the best workers by offering better benefits and truly lifetime job security. By the 1960s, employment at a large prestigious company had become the goal of children of the new middle class, the pursuit of which required mobilization of family resources and great individual perseverance in order to achieve success in the fiercely competitive education system.

Employees are expected to work hard and demonstrate loyalty to the firm, in exchange for some degree of job security and benefits, such as housing subsidies, good insurance, the use of recreation facilities, and bonuses and pensions. Wages begin low, but seniority is rewarded, with promotions based on a combination of seniority and ability. Leadership is not based on assertiveness or quick decision-making but on the ability to create consensus, taking into account the needs of subordinates. Surveys indicate a continued preference for bosses who are demanding but show concern for workers' private lives over less-demanding bosses interested only in performance on the job.

This system rewards behavior demonstrating identification with the team effort, indicated by singing the company song, not taking all of one's vacation days, and sharing credit for accomplishments with the workgroup. Pride in one's work is expressed through competition with other parallel sections in the company and between one's company and other companies in similar lines of business. Thus, individuals are motivated to maintain wa (harmony) and participate in group activities, not only on the job but also in after-hours socializing (nomikai). The image of group loyalty, however, is more of a matter of ideology than practice, especially for people who do not make it to the top.

Smaller companies

Not every worker enjoys the benefits of such employment practices and work environments. Although 64% of households in 1985 depended on wages or salaries for most of their income, most of these workers were employed by small and medium-sized firms that could not afford the benefits or achieve the successes of the large companies, despite the best intentions of owners. Even in the large corporations, distinctions between permanent and temporary employees made many workers, often women, ineligible for benefits and promotions. These workers were also the first to be laid off in difficult business conditions.

Japan scholar Dorinne K. Kondo compares the status of permanent and temporary workers with Bachnik's distinctions between permanent and temporary members of an "ie" (家, see Japanese family), creating degrees of inside and outside within a firm. Traditions of entrepreneurship and of inheritance of the means of livelihood continued among merchants, artisans, farmers, and fishermen, still nearly 20% of the work force in 1985. These workers gave up security for autonomy and, when economically necessary, supplemented household income with wage employment.

Traditionally, such businesses use unpaid family labor, but wives or even husbands are likely to go off to work in factories or offices and leave spouses or retired parents to work the farm or mind the shop. On the one hand, policies of decentralization provide factory jobs locally for families that farm part-time; on the other hand, unemployment created by deindustrialization affects rural as well as urban workers. Whereas unemployment is low in Japan compared with other industrialized nations (less than 3% through the late 1980s), an estimated 400,000 day laborers share none of the security or affluence enjoyed by those employees with lifetime-employment benefits.

In the standard model, workers receive two fairly large bonuses as well as their regular salary, one mid-year and the other at year's end. In 1988 workers in large companies received bonuses equivalent to their pay for 1.9 months while workers in the smallest firms gained bonuses equal to 1.2 months' pay. In addition to bonuses, Japanese workers received a number of fringe benefits, such as living allowances, incentive payments, remuneration for special job conditions, allowances for good attendance, and cost-of-living allowances.

Working conditions

Japanese working hours have been gradually decreasing. On average, employees worked a forty-six-hour week in 1987; employees of most large corporations worked a modified five-day week with two Saturdays a month, while those in most small firms worked as much as six days each week. In the face of mounting international criticism of excessive working hours in Japan, in January 1989 public agencies began closing two Saturdays a month. Japanese labor unions made reduced working hours an important part of their demands, and many larger firms responded in a positive manner.

In 1986 the average employee worked 2,097 hours in Japan, compared with 1,828 hours in the United States and 1,702 in France. By 1995 the average annual hours in Japan had decreased to 1,884 hours and by 2009 to 1,714 hours. 

In 2019, the average Japanese employee worked 1,644 hours, lower than workers in Spain, Canada and Italy. By comparison, the average American worker worked 1,779 hours in 2019. The average Japanese worker is mandated to ten to twenty days of paid holidays per year, depending on the number of continuous years worked at the company.

Despite the long work hours Japan has consistently ranked last in productivity among the G7 countries since the 1970s. In 2020, Japan ranked 23rd, below Lithuania in per-hour labor productivity compared to other OECD nations.

Employment security
Japanese employment protection is unique and dynamic compared to other nations. Loyalty to one's company is paramount in the Japanese culture. Many Japanese firms only promote from within, as a result individuals may stay with the same company for their entire life. Japanese workers seek to invest and improve their company, while firms attempt to maintain a family atmosphere and look after employees. Disappointing coworkers, calling in sick, and having a poor attitude are unacceptable. Firms in Japan do everything in their power to ensure employment security and prevent laying off employees. Firms' attempts at prevention may include negotiating better deals with suppliers, requesting government subsidies, and eliminating overtime. The relationship between employer and employee promotes employment security, work ethic, and willingness to work long hours.

Impact on Japan's welfare state 
Liberal and conservative philosophies combine to form Japan's welfare state. The welfare state and working conditions are interconnected. As a result of declining working hours over the years, less stress was put on the welfare state. In 2012 the average Japanese citizen visited a medical facility twelve times, which is three times more doctors' visits than the average United States citizen. This is partly due to low-cost medical expenses and partly due to increased stress from working conditions.

Stress has a huge negative impact physiological and mental factors for individuals. Work hours vary between firms and company size. In medium to large-sized companies hours have increased. The stress from working over twelve hours a day is a contributing factor to Japanese citizens' frequent medical visits. The majority of Japanese hospitals being privately owned alludes to conservative influence, while the government enforcing strict regulations and pricing on medical treatment alludes to the liberal aspect of their welfare state.

The general Japanese health insurance system resembles a dualist one. The National Health Insurance(Kokumin-Kenkō-Hoken) is directed regionally, and provides mandatory health insurance to the non-employed citizenry. Until age 70, those covered by the National Health Insurance must self-finance 30% of their medical costs. Firms are required to provide mandatory health insurance to employees under Employees Health and Pension Insurance, or Shakai Hoken. For the employed, maintaining this access to healthcare is greatly tied to their employment security. As a result, the cost of losing a job also includes the cost of losing access to the expansive benefits of employer-provided healthcare insurance. Leaving the workforce due to dismissal, family complications, or health related issues can potentially diminish access to welfare benefits. Due to the high mandated costs on firms imposed by the Employees Health Insurance scheme, the incentive to provide increased non-mandatory welfare provisions is undermined.

Declining health conditions in the Japanese labor force and the issue of overtime work has led to policy expansion and reform on the behalf of the Ministry of Health, Labor, and Welfare. As of March 2018, the Labour Standards Act states that an employer should not exceed a 40-hour work week for employees. Exceeding this work week requires an exclusive worker-management agreement, and overtime and this work is to be compensated for with a corresponding wage increase. For example, overtime and night work both require an increase by a rate of 25% at the minimum. The increasing cases of Karōshi, or health and workplace accidents resulting from overtime work have led to reforms in the Industrial Health and Safety Law as well. Although non-binding, these reforms mandate employers to arrange for overtime workers to be provided with health guidance.

Karoshi

Karoshi is death by overworking in the Japanese workplace. These are commonly caused by heart attack and stroke, as well as suicide, brought on by high amounts of stress from working 60 hours or more per week.

Matsuri Takahashi's case (2016) 
In 2016, the suicide of an overworked young woman brought Japan's working environment into question once again. Matsuri Takahashi, then 24, committed suicide on Christmas Day of 2015 after excessive overwork at Dentsu Inc., a major Japanese advertising agency. Her suicide occurred only 8 months after she got her first full-time job at Dentsu, straight out of college. Her social media posts suggested that she was getting less than 2 hours of sleep per day before she committed suicide. Her death was acknowledged as death related to work, known as "karoshi" in Japanese, by Mita Labor Standard Inspection Office in Tokyo.

According to the early reports by the labor standard inspection office, Matsuri Takahashi had more than 105 hours of monthly overtime. According to the Japanese Labor Law, only 8 hours a day, or 40 hours a week, are allowed. If Japanese companies wish to extend their employee's working hours, they must first conclude special treaties to get acceptance from the government, per Labor Standards Act No.36. Within the limitation made by the treaty, working hours could be decided among employees, employers and labor unions. However, unions in Japan usually agree with the decisions made by the corporation.

This case was especially focused on by the public and death from overwork was again in public attention. After hearing public reaction on this matter, labor standard inspection office had compulsory inspection to Dentsu, and revealed there was a corporate norm to make sure its employees were recording less working time when they enter or exit the office. This case was shocking because Matsuri Takahashi was not the first young employee to have committed suicide in Dentsu. In 1991, a young Dentsu employee killed himself in a similar circumstance. After this incident, there was an order from the Supreme Court in 2000 toward Dentsu to improve working conditions.

Matsuri Takahashi's case proved that Dentsu's corporate environment had not changed since the death of its employees in 1991. Dentsu blamed Matsuri Takahashi's case partly on a serious lack of humanpower in the growing divisions, such as internet advisement. The CEO of Dentsu made an announcement to the public saying, "We should have come to grips with the situation by increasing the number of staff in those divisions". In Japan, lifetime employment still remains in numbers of companies and therefore, it is difficult to hire and fire people depending on the company's needs. This CEO's quote indicates Japanese social structure which is stable but have low mobility which may cause stress toward employees.

After her case, the Abe administration pitched a conference to improve working conditions in Japan. The first meeting was held in September, 2016. In addition to that, the Japanese government announced their first report about over-worked death. According to this official announcement, 23% of the major companies in Japan have possibility of having illegal over-work. The Minister of Health, Labour and Welfare, Yasuhisa Shiozaki, who is responsible for Labour Standard Inspection Office, emphasised the importance of strengthening these sectors.

The labour standard inspection office is now suffering from lack of manpower compared to the numbers of companies they need to investigate. After facing criticism from the public, Labour Standards Act No.36 now faces the possibility of amendment, for it has proven its incompetence. Although many of the labour law are claimed to be amended, the social norm of Japan, including strong corporatism, are preventing these laws to be no more than self-imposed control and effort obligation.

Future
There is a growing shift in Japanese working conditions, due to both the government intervention as a result of declining birth rates and labour productivity, and companies competing for increasingly scarce numbers of workers due to a drop in the working-age population as a result of low birth rates. Many Japanese companies are reducing work hours and improving working conditions, including by providing amenities such as sports facilities and gyms. The Japanese government is pushing through a bill that would make it compulsory for employees to take a minimum of five days leave, and to ensure that high-income employees in certain sectors such as finance be paid according to performance rather than hours worked.

The issue of Japan's work culture was even prioritised by the former Prime Minister Shinzo Abe. In 2019, the Act on the Arrangement of related Acts to Promote Work Style Reform, which is also known as the Work Style Reform Act, was passed by the National Diet. This law sought to reform eight key labour laws to improve working conditions.

See also

 Labour unions in Japan
 Black company (Japanese term)
 Simultaneous recruiting of new graduates
 Japanese employment law
 Japanese management culture
 Salaryman
 Japanese blue collar workers

References

  - Japan

External links
My Life in Corporate Japan
Politeness levels in business Japanese

Society of Japan
Economy of Japan
Employment in Japan